Claudio Bincaz (10 May 1897 – 8 November 1980) was an Argentine sportsman who competed in sailing, association football and rugby union for the Club Atlético San Isidro during the decade of 1920.

On 10 July 1916, Bincaz played for the Argentina national football team at the 1916 South American Championship (current "Copa América"). He was on the grandstand before being called for the team to replace Alberto Ohaco, who had not attended the match because of his duties. As a result, Bincaz played as left winger against Brazil.

In rugby, Bincaz was part of the CA San Isidro squad that achieved a record of 13 consecutive championship won between and 1917 and 1930.

During his career he also represented the Argentine national rugby union team.

The Argentina rugby team was close to participate in the 1924 Summer Olympics. The Argentine Rugby Union decided that the roster would be elected by popular vote. Bincaz was the 2nd most voted played but the team finally could not travel to Paris due to financial problems.

References 

1897 births
1980 deaths
Argentine footballers
Association football forwards
Argentina international footballers
Argentine rugby union players
Argentine male sailors (sport)
Sailors at the 1936 Summer Olympics – 6 Metre
Olympic sailors of Argentina
B